The Antonovych Prize is an annual award of US$10,000 given by the Omelian and Tetiana Antonovych Foundation, since 1981 for literary works written in Ukrainian and for research in Ukrainian studies. Institutions, individuals, and members of the prize jury can make nominations, but only the jury decides the winners. Laureates are asked to give a speech at an award ceremony.

Laureates 
 2020 – Svoboda, Ukrainian newspaper
 2019 – Alexander J. Motyl, American political scientist and writer
 2018 – Yuriy Shcherbak, Ukrainian writer
 2017 – Anne Applebaum, American journalist
 2016 – Bohdan Prakh, Polish-Ukrainian church historian
 2015 – Serhii Plokhii, Ukrainian-American historian
 2014 – Timothy D. Snyder, American historian
 2013 – Leonid Finberg, Ukrainian sociologist, publisher
 2012 – Zenon E. Kohut, Canadian historian; Frank Sysyn, Canadian historian
 2011 – Andrea Graziosi, Italian historian; Stanislav Kultsytskyi, Ukrainian historian
 2010 – Aleksandra Hnatiuk, Polish slavist; Bogumiła Berdychowska, Polish writer and journalist
 2009 – Liubomyr Vynar, Ukrainian-American historian; Oksana Zabuzhko, Ukrainina writer
 2008 – George G. Grabowicz, American literature scholar; Andriy Dzhul
 2007 – Yaroslav Hrytsak, Ukrainian historian
 2006 – Borys Gudziak, Eparch of the Ukrainian Greek Catholic Eparchy of Paris
 2005 – not awarded
 2004 – Andriy Sodomora, Ukrainian translator and writer; Dmytro Pavlychko, Ukrainian poet
 2003 – Mykola Riabchuk, Ukrainian political analyst; Roman Ivanychuk, Ukraininan writer
 2002 – Yuriy Shapoval, Ukrainian historian; Hryhoriy Huseynov, Ukrainian writer; Yaroslav Isayevych, Ukrainian historian
 2001 – Yurii Andrukhovych, Ukrainian writer; Michael Hamm, Ameriacan historian; Roman Szporluk, American historian
 2000 – Yuriy Badzyo, Ukrainian literature scholar
 1999 – Ihor Ševčenko, Ukrainian-American philologist and historian
 1998 – Yuriy Barabash, Ukrainian literature scholar; George S. N. Luckyj, Ukrainian-American literature scholar
 1997 – Dmytro Stepovyk, Ukrainian art scholar; Ihor Kalynets, Ukrainian poet and Soviet dissident
 1996 – Bohdan Bociurkiw, Canadian-Ukrainian historian; Hryhoriy Lohvyn, Ukrainian art scholar and architect; Yuriy Mushketyk, Ukrainian writer
 1995 – Mykhailyna Kotsiubynska, Ukrainian literature scholar; Vyacheslav Bryukhovetskyi, Ukrainian literature scholar; Roman Fedoriv, Ukrainian writer
 1994 – Olena Apanovich, Ukrainian historian; Yevhen Hutsalo, Ukrainian writer
 1993 – Mykola Zhulynskyi, Ukrainian literature scholar; Yaroslav Dashkevych, Ukrainian historian; Mykola Vinhranovskyi, Ukrainian writer and actor
 1992 – Literaturna Ukrayina, Ukrainian newspaper; Mykhaylo Braychevskyi, Ukrainian historian; Volodymyr Drozd, Ukrainian writer
 1991 – Bohdan Hawrylyshyn, Ukrainian-Swiss economist; Zbigniew Brzezinski, American political scientist; Ivan Drach, Ukrainian poet
 1990 – Ivan Dziuba, Ukrainian literary critic and dissident; Valeriy Shevchuk, Ukrainian writer
 1989 – Martha Bohachevsky-Chomiak, American historian; Lina Kostenko, Ukrainian poet
 1988 – John-Paul Himka, American-Canadian historian; George Shevelov, Ukrainian-American Slavic linguist; Hryhoriy Kostyuk, Ukrainian literature scholar
 1987 – Robert Conquest, British historian; Leonid Plyushch, Ukrainian mathematician and Soviet dissident
 1986 – Bohdan Krawchenko, Canadian political scientist; Natalya Livytska-Holodna, Ukrainian writer
 1985 – David Saunders, British historian; Yuriy Lavrinenko, Ukrainian literature scholar
 1984 – Magdalena László-Kuțiuk, Romanian Slavic scholar and translator; Yuriy Kolomiyets, Ukrainian poet
 1983 – Linda Gordon, American feminist and historian; Emma Andijewska, Ukrainian poet and painter
 1982 – Orest Subtelny, Canadian historian; Vasyl Stus, Ukrainian poet and dissident
 1981 – Vasyl Barka, Ukrainian writer

Literature 
 Фундація Омеляна і Тетяни Антоновичів: Штрихи до історії Фундації. Виступи і лекції лавреатів нагород Антоновичів (1982–1998). — К., 1999. — 197с. — 
 Фундація Омеляна і Тетяни Антоновичів : матеріали до історії фундації : листування, грамоти, виступу та лекції лавреатів нагород Антоновичів (1998–2011). — Львів-Вашингтон: Львівська національна наукова бібліотека України імені В. Стефаника, 2012

References

Awards established in 1980
Ukrainian studies
Humanities awards
Ukrainian literary awards